Chris Lange is a New Zealand local rally driver. He made his debut in 2005 originally driving a 1996 Mitsubishi Mirage in the South Island Rally series winning the 1600cc 2WD class.

In 2007 has entered the New Zealand National Championship Rally driving a Ford Fiesta ST in the Vantage Aluminium Joinery 2007 New Zealand Rally Championship in class N3. This is also a part of the International Fiesta Sporting Trophy competition. 2008 plans include Fiesta Sporting trophy and New Zealand Rally Championship again. Malcolm Peden will be co-driving.

2007 NZRC results
{|class="wikitable"
! Round
! Rally
! Date
! Co-driver
! Result
|-
| 1
| Rally of Otago
| 13–15 April 2007
| Malcolm Peden
| 2nd Fiesta / 16th Overall
|-
| 2
| Rally of Whangarei (doubles as APRC round)
| 11–13 May 2007
| Malcolm Peden
| Retired due to Gearbox Failure SS1
|-
| 3
| Rally Wairarapa
| 2–3 June 2007
| Malcolm Peden
| 2nd Fiesta / 11th NZRC Overall
|-
| 4
| Rally of Hawkes Bay
| 4 August 2007
| Malcolm Peden
|
|-
| 5
| Rally New Zealand (doubles as WRC round)
| 31 August – 2 September 2007
| Malcolm Peden
| 2nd Fiesta /
|-
| 6
| Rally of Nelson
| 30 September 2007
| Malcolm Peden
| Retired after clutch failure
|-
|}

External links
 Official site
 Motorsport New Zealand

1982 births
Living people
New Zealand rally drivers